Soliman Airstrip  is an airstrip serving Soliman in Tunisia.

See also
Transport in Tunisia

References

 Google Earth

Airports in Tunisia